Sigarud (also Romanized as Sīgārūd and Sigarood) is a village in Daryasar Rural District, Kumeleh District, Langarud County, Gilan Province, Iran. At the 2006 census, its population was 632, in 204 families.

References 

Populated places in Langarud County